Oleksii Bryzghalov (born 26 July 1971) is a Ukrainian fencer. He competed in the foil events at the 1996 and 2000 Summer Olympics. He is now a foil referee for the International Fencing Federation.

References

External links
 

1971 births
Living people
Ukrainian male foil fencers
Olympic fencers of Ukraine
Fencers at the 1996 Summer Olympics
Fencers at the 2000 Summer Olympics